Jim White (born 1957) is a British journalist and presenter. He attended Manchester Grammar School and read English at Bristol University.

Writing
White was a founding member of staff at The Independent in 1986. He has covered major sporting events for the Daily Telegraph since 2003, after leaving The Guardian. He is an ardent Manchester United supporter and writes a regular column for fanzines United We Stand and The Telegraph. He also writes articles for Yahoo! Eurosport.

White has also written a book, You'll Win Nothing with Kids, a memoir of his time as a wholly unsuccessful junior football coach.

Broadcasting
White is a long-serving contributor to BBC Radio 4 and Five Live, including appearances as a guest pundit on Fighting Talk. He has also appeared on Sky, for whom he has written and presented documentaries on Jose Mourinho and Sven-Göran Eriksson, and previously presented a sports current affairs show, The Back Page, on STV.

Personal life
White has a son, Barney, and a daughter Ellie who is a comedian and actress.

References

British male journalists
British sports broadcasters
British sportswriters
British television presenters
People educated at Manchester Grammar School
Alumni of the University of Bristol
Living people
People from Urmston
1957 births